This is list of libraries in Estonia. The list is incomplete.

See also 
 List of archives in Estonia
 List of museums in Estonia

References 

 
Libraries
Estonia
Libraries